Triisodontidae is an extinct, probably paraphyletic, or possibly invalid family of mesonychian placental mammals.  Most triisodontid genera lived during the Paleocene in North America, but the genus Andrewsarchus (if it is a mesonychian, and not an artiodactyl) is known from the middle Eocene of Asia. Triisodontids were the first relatively large predatory mammals to appear in North America following the extinction of the non-bird dinosaurs. They differ from other mesonychian families in having less highly modified teeth.

Because of their comparatively simpler teeth, the Triisodontids are regarded as basal mesonychids.  A recent study found them to be a paraphyletic assemblage of stem-mesonychians.

References

Mesonychids
Eocene extinctions
Paleocene first appearances
Paraphyletic groups
Prehistoric mammal families